State Route 25 (SR 25) is a state highway in the U.S. state of California between State Route 198 in Monterey County and U.S. Route 101 in Santa Clara south of Gilroy. For most of its length, SR 25 runs through the center of San Benito County.

Route description

SR 25 (also known as Bolsa Road and the Airline Highway) begins at the intersection of Peach Tree Road and State Route 198 about 11 miles west of Priest Valley, in Monterey County, and is the northern extension of Peach Tree Road. It heads northwest, crossing into San Benito County and passing through the community of Bitterwater. SR 25 provides access to the Pinnacles National Park east entrance, running parallel to the San Andreas Fault. Running parallel to the Gabilan Range and Diablo Range, SR 25 passes through the communities of Paicines and Tres Pinos before reaching the city of Hollister.

Upon reaching Hollister, the route turns into a four-lane undivided road, curving north and west through the east side of the city. North of Hollister, SR 25 reverts into a 2-lane road and continues northwest from Hollister, intersecting with State Route 156. From there, the route is a partially divided road until just short of a railroad crossing and eventually crossing the Pajaro River into Santa Clara County. The route then heads northwest, and at the intersection with Bloomfield Avenue, the route then curves west before its northern terminus at U.S. Route 101 south of Gilroy.

SR 25 is part of the California Freeway and Expressway System, and a small portion near Hollister is part of the National Highway System, a network of highways that are considered essential to the country's economy, defense, and mobility by the Federal Highway Administration. SR 25 is eligible to be included in the State Scenic Highway System, but it is not officially designated as a scenic highway by the California Department of Transportation.

History

The Airline Highway Association was organized in 1933-4 and was composed of representatives of Alameda, Santa Clara, San Benito, Kern and Kings Counties. Its purpose was to establish this "Airline Highway". In the Oakland Tribune article, (Tues. June 19, 1934 page 5. "NEW AIRLINE, HIGHWAY TO L.A. PLANNED") it states "the highway would follow the air line between the northern and southern part of the state as closely as possible". The use of the word Airline is confusing as we associate it with modern-day transportation. In this sense it is defined as an Americanism dating back to 1805 meaning "traveling a direct route".

Major intersections

See also

References

External links

Caltrans: Route 25 highway conditions
California Highways: SR 25
California @ AARoads.com - State Route 25
Final Transportation Concept Report for State Route 25 in Caltrans Districts 4 and 5

025
State Route 025
State Route 025
State Route 025
Diablo Range
Gabilan Range
Hollister, California
Pinnacles National Park